Asura irregularis is a moth of the  family Erebidae. It is found in China.

References

irregularis
Moths described in 1913
Taxa named by Walter Rothschild
Moths of Asia